The 1902 International Lawn Tennis Challenge was the second edition of what is now known as the Davis Cup. The tie was played at the Crescent Athletic Club in Brooklyn, New York, United States. The Crescent Athletic Club was located at Narrows Avenue and 85th Street, site at present of the Fort Hamilton HS Athletic Field.

Result
United States vs. British Isles

References

External links
Davis Cup official website

Davis Cups by year
International Lawn Tennis Challenge
International Lawn Tennis Challenge
International Lawn Tennis